Henry Gunning was senior Esquire Bedell (ceremonial officer) of the University of Cambridge.

Henry Gunning is also the name of:

Henry C. Gunning (1901–1991), Canadian geologist and academic
Sir Henry John Gunning (1797–1885), 4th of the Gunning baronets

See also
Harry Gunning (1916–2002), scientist